The Thai League All-Star football team is an annual exhibition match organised by the Football Association of Thailand and sponsors or affiliated clubs in the Thai League 1. The inaugural match was played in 2008.

Fixtures and results

Squads

2013 All-Star members
Match Date: July 13, 2013
Opposition: Manchester United
Competition: Singha 80th Anniversary Cup

Match Date: July 17, 2013 
Opposition: Chelsea 
Competition: Singha 80th Anniversary Cup

Match Date: July 24, 2013
Opposition: Thailand U-23
Competition: Friendly

2014 All-Star members (Japanese players)
Match Date: July 16, 2014
Opposition: Thailand U-23
Competition: Friendly match Thailand Asian Game Team VS All-Star Japan Thai Premier League

2017 All-Star members
Match Date: August 26, 2017
Opposition: Thailand
Competition: Come Together - Together For Thailand Charity Match

2020 All-Star members
Match Date: November 14, 2020
Opposition: Thailand
Competition:  THE WARRIORS ARE HERE

References

All-Star Football